Goll Woods State Nature Preserve is a  nature preserve in western Fulton County, Ohio, near Archbold. It has been designated a National Natural Landmark for its oak–hickory forest.

History
It is named after Peter and Catherine Goll, who moved to America from Grand Charmont, France in 1836. The Goll family descendants loved the big trees and guarded the woods against of timber operators for several generations. The State of Ohio established the nature preserve in 1969.

Features

Natural

The nature preserve features gigantic 200-400 year old-growth trees that often measure 4 feet in diameter, reminiscent of the Great Black Swamp. There is a small area that preserves the rare ecosystem of Oak Openings, which consists very large specimens of white and bur oaks, but without any of
the small under story trees. The Indians of the area created an open savanna to facilitate their hunting by keeping the brush and small trees down, by burning in the fall. The first settlers could easily drive their wagons in any direction through the sparsely spaced trees.

Trees
The preserve is composed of Elm-Ash-Maple swamp forest and mesophytic forest with many oak trees in the lower elevations. Because of drainage efforts for agriculture, the woods is transitioning slowly to Beech-Maple forest.  In 2006, one of the largest burr oak trees, over 450 years old, died of old age. It had a DBH (diameter at breast height) of 56 inches and stood 112 feet tall.

Wildflowers
Early in the year, over 40 species of ephemeral spring wildflowers including large flowered trillium, Ohio's state wildflower, bloodroot, columbine, marsh marigold, spotted coral-root and three-birds-orchid are in bloom.

Historical
Besides being a nature preserve, Goll Woods also holds historical significance.

Goll Homestead
On the nature preserve is a historic farm complex known as Goll Homestead, initially designated for destruction, but now listed on the National Register of Historic Places, with its distinctive European design, constructed of large timbers.

Goll Cemetery

Goll cemetery also lies on the preserve grounds. The 3/4 acre burial ground was set aside early by Peter and Catherine Goll, where they laid to rest a young child. Many from the Goll family are now buried there, as well as those from Louys, Valiton, Beucler, Seigneur, Cramer, and Klopfenstein families.  The cemetery is rumored to be haunted.

Lockport Covered Bridge
Nearby, just 1.3 miles southwest of the nature preserve, on County Road I-25, is the Lockport Covered Bridge in Lock Port, Ohio, spanning the Tiffin River that runs near the nature preserve.  It is feature on the Northwest Ohio River Trail and was a winner in the 2002 National Timber Bridge Awards competition, and is often associated by travelers with the nature preserve.

Notes

External links 
Goll Woods State Nature Preserve Ohiodnr.gov.
Oak Openings Initiative, Swanton, Ohio

Ohio State Nature Preserves
National Natural Landmarks in Ohio
Protected areas of Fulton County, Ohio
Tourist attractions in Fulton County, Ohio
Fulton County, Ohio
Hiking trails in Ohio
Reportedly haunted locations in Ohio
Protected areas established in 1969
1969 establishments in Ohio
Forests of Ohio